The Thailand national cricket team is the team that represents Thailand in international cricket. The team is organised by the Cricket Association of Thailand, which has been an associate member of the International Cricket Council (ICC) since 2005, having been an affiliate member between 1995 and 2005. Almost all of Thailand's matches have come against other Asian teams, including in several Asian Cricket Council tournaments.

History

Beginnings
Cricket was introduced to Thailand by the children of elite Thai families who learnt the game during education in England. They founded the Bangkok City Cricket Club in 1890, and the side played its first game in November of that year. An invitation to come to the city was sent to the Singapore Cricket Club, but it was turned down due to the fear of a cholera epidemic.

Cricket in the Thai community failed to develop however, and by the early-1900s the game was confined almost entirely to expatriate residents. The Royal Bangkok Sports Club began to play cricket in 1905 and they were instrumental in arranging the first international in January 1909, when Siam beat the Straits Settlements by an innings in Singapore. Siam won the return match in Bangkok the following year, and the Straits Settlements won the third and final match in December 1911.

Cricket remained a recreational activity, with a national side not surfacing again until 1990. Various sides came to play the Royal Bangkok Sports Club in the 1960s and 1970s, including Worcestershire in 1965 and the MCC in 1970. This encouraged the development of more cricket facilities.

Modern era
One player based in Thailand in the late-1980s and early-1990s was Ronald Endley, who worked for Volvo and persuaded the company to offer a trophy for a match against Hong Kong. This match was played in January 1990 and took the form of a two-day match, which was drawn. It became a one-day match in 1991, and 1992 saw Malaysia join in for a tri-series. The tournament was superseded by the Tuanku Ja'afar Cup, which involved all three teams along with Singapore.

The early-1990s were one of the most successful periods for Thai cricket, but tight ICC player eligibility rules came into force when they became an ICC affiliate member in 1995, which led to them being forced to field weaker teams. This coincided with financial problems, causing Thailand to pull out of tournaments. In contrast, the early part of the 21st century has seen youth cricket take priority in addition to much more being done to promote the game beyond the expatriate population.

In August 2017, Thailand won the bronze medal in the 50-over tournament in cricket at the 2017 Southeast Asian Games. They placed fourth in the 20-over tournament, losing to Indonesia.

2018-Present
In April 2018, the ICC granted full Twenty20 International (T20I) status to all its members. All Twenty20 matches played between Thailand and other ICC members since 1 January 2019 are a full T20I. 

Thailand played their first T20I on 24 June against Malaysia during the 2019 Malaysia Tri-Nation Series.

International grounds
 Terdthai Cricket Ground, Bangkok
 Asian Institute of Technology Ground, Pathum Thani

Tournament history

Asia Cup Qualifier 
2018: Did not participate
2020: Did not qualify

ACC Eastern Region T20
 2018: Runner up
 2020: 5th place

ACC Trophy 
1996: First round
1998: First round
2000: Did not participate
2002: First round
2004: First round
2006: First round
ACC Trophy Challenge

Thailand hosted the 2009, 2010 and 2012 ACC Trophy Challenge, the second tier of the limited-overs competition for non-Test-playing ACC members.
2009 Challenge: 4th place
2010 Challenge: 4th place
2012 Challenge: 4th place
Thailand has not participated in the ACC Premier League.

Southeast Asian Games

Records and statistics
International Match Summary — Thailand
 
Last updated 9 July 2022

Twenty20 International 

 Highest team total: 154/5 v Maldives on 29 June 2019 at Kinrara Academy Oval, Kuala Lumpur.
 Highest individual score: 54*, Naveed Pathan v Maldives on 29 June 2019 at Kinrara Academy Oval, Kuala Lumpur.
 Best individual bowling figures: 4/18, Daniel Jacobs v Maldives on 29 June 2019 at Kinrara Academy Oval, Kuala Lumpur.

T20I record versus other nations

Records complete to T20I #1623. Last updated 9 July 2022.

Other matches
For a list of selected international matches played by Thailand, see Cricket Archive.

See also
 Cricket Association of Thailand
 List of Thailand Twenty20 International cricketers
 Thailand women's national cricket team

References

Cricket in Thailand
National cricket teams
Cricket
Thailand in international cricket